Operculina turpethum (syn. Ipomoea turpethum) is a species of plant in the morning glory family, known commonly as turpeth, fue vao, and St. Thomas lidpod.

It is perennial, herbaceous, and hairy vine growing 4 to 5 meters in length, endemic to India. It is commonly found in the North Circars and Deccan region up to 3000 ft. The leaves are alternate, very variable in shape, ovate, oblong and truncate or cordate at the base. The flowers are large, axillary, and solitary. The fruit is a capsule with conspicuous enlarged sepals and thickened pedicles.

It is actually not a purgative but a mild laxative.

References

External links

 Contains a detailed monograph on Operculina turpethum (Trivrit), as well as a discussion of health benefits and usage in clinical practice. Available online at http://www.toddcaldecott.com/index.php/herbs/learning-herbs/337-trivrit

Convolvulaceae